Checkered Flag or Chequered Flag may refer to:

 Checkered flag, or chequered flag, a type of racing flag

Films
 The Checkered Flag (1926 film), an American silent drama film
 The Checkered Flag (1963 film), a film directed by William Grefe
 The Checkered Flag (1967 film) or Devil's Angels, an American outlaw biker film
 Checkered Flag (film), a 1990 film by John Glen and Michael Levine

Music
 Checkered Flag (album), a 1963 album by Dick Dale and his Del-Tones
 "The Chequered Flag (Dead or Alive)", a song by Jethro Tull from Too Old to Rock 'n' Roll: Too Young to Die!

Video games
 Chequered Flag (video game), a 1983 game by Sinclair Research Ltd.
 Chequered Flag (1988 video game), an arcade game by Konami
 Checkered Flag (1991 video game), for Atari Lynx video game
 Checkered Flag (1994 video game) for the Atari Jaguar